Another Magazine, styled AnOther, is an international fashion and culture bi-annual.

Founded in 2001, its Editor-in-Chief is Susannah Frankel, who joined in January 2016. Frankel had been Fashion Features Director of the magazine since its launch and a regular contributor to Dazed & Confused since 1998.

Issues 
In 2015 AnOther Magazine was the first magazine to have a high definition LED moving cover.

In 2016, to celebrate its 15th anniversary AnOther Magazine commissioned holographer and artist Rob Munday to create 1000 limited edition hand-made 3D covers of Karl Lagerfeld.

References

External links
 

Biannual magazines published in the United Kingdom
Lifestyle magazines published in the United Kingdom
Fashion magazines
Independent magazines
Magazines published in London
Magazines established in 2001
2001 establishments in the United Kingdom